Bandhani Colony is a neighborhood in the Karachi Central district of Karachi, Pakistan. It was previously a part of Liaquatabad Town, which was disbanded in 2011. It is one of the neighbourhoods of Liaquatabad Town in Karachi, Sindh, Pakistan. There are several ethnic groups including Muhajirs, Sindhis, Kashmiris, Seraikis, Pakhtuns, Balochis, Memons, Bohras Ismailis, etc., among them 99% are Muslims.

The population of Bandhani Colony is about 15,000 with 65% poverty and 25% literacy rate.

References

Neighbourhoods of Karachi
Liaquatabad Town